Air Niger was an airline based in Niamey, Niger.

History
The airline was formed in 1966 by the government of Niger with assistance from Air France and Union des Transports Aériens, taking over services from the defunct Aero Niger. Besides former air taxi and charter operations of Aero Niger, the new airline took over Air France domestic services in Niger and to Upper Volta, Nigeria and Chad. In addition to providing technical assistance to the airline, Air France and UTA held a financial stake in the airline via their holdings in SODETRAF, and Air Afrique also held a stake in the airline. The airline which was 94.5% owned by the Niger government ceased operations in 1993.

Services and fleet
The airline operated services from Niamey to Tahoua, Maradi, Zinder and Agadez, and in the late 1960s its fleet comprised one Douglas DC-3 and one Douglas DC-4. Plans were made to extend its network to Upper Volta, Chad and Nigeria. Throughout the 1970s its fleet comprised two DC-3s, and by the late 1980s it was operating two Hawker Siddeley HS.748s on domestic services and to Lomé in Togo.

Destinations

Fleet 

Douglas C-47
Douglas DC-3
Douglas DC-4
Douglas DC-6
Fokker F-27-600 Friendship
Hawker Siddeley HS 748

Accidents and incidents
On 10 June 1977, Douglas C-47 5U-AAJ was written off in a forced landing at Founkouey following an engine failure. The aircraft was on a scheduled passenger flight which had departed from Tahoua Airport. All 21 people on board survived.

References

Defunct airlines of Niger
Airlines established in 1966
Airlines disestablished in 1993
Government-owned airlines
1966 establishments in Niger
1993 disestablishments in Africa
Companies based in Niamey